Justice Raja is a 1983 Indian Malayalam language film, directed by R. Krishnamoorthy. The film stars Prem Nazir, Menaka, Balan K. Nair and K. R. Vijaya. The film has musical score by Gangai Amaran. The film was a remake of Telugu film Justice Chowdary.

Cast
Prem Nazir as Rajashekharan, Gopi (double role)
Menaka as Thulasi
Balan K. Nair as Narendran, Nagendran (double role)
K. R. Vijaya as Sreedevi
Sujatha as Radha
Sankaradi as Raman Nair
P. K. Abraham as Rahim
Adoor Bhasi as Adv. Sharma
Sathyakala as Raji
Mala Aravindan as Kuttappan
Mohan Jose as Jagan
Shanavas as Sankar
Raadhika as Anitha
Silk Smitha as Dancer
Lalu Alex as Shaji
Kollam G. K. Pilla as Rajasekharan's father
P. R. Menon as Menon
Rajashekharan as Prasad

Soundtrack
The music was composed by Gangai Amaran and the lyrics were written by Poovachal Khader.

References

External links
 

1983 films
1980s Malayalam-language films
Malayalam remakes of Telugu films